Richard, Rich, Ricky, Rick and Dick Owens may refer to:

Dick Owens (1812–1902), American frontiersman, companion of Kit Carson, a/k/a Richard Lemon Owings
Richard Owens (architect) (1831–1891), Welsh builder of urban housing in Liverpool
Richard Owens (bishop) (1840–1909), Irish Catholic bishop of Clogher   
Rich Owens (corrections officer) (1880–1948), American executioner in Oklahoma, 1918–1947   
Ricky Owens (1939–1996), American singer, member of The Vibrations
Rick Owens (born 1962), American fashion designer
Rich Owens (born 1972), American football defensive lineman
Richard Owens (poet) (born 1973), American publisher and critic
Richard Owens (American football) (born 1980), American tight end

See also
Richard Owen (disambiguation)